The following radio stations broadcast on AM frequency 1120 kHz: 1120 AM is a United States clear-channel frequency. KMOX in St. Louis, Missouri is the dominant station on 1120 AM.

In Argentina 
 LV5 Sarmiento in San Juan
 Sudamericana in San Andrés
 Tango in CABA

In Mexico 
  in Mexicali, Baja California
  in San Jose Zilotzingo, Puebla
  in Mérida, Yucatán
  in Tenosique, Tabasco
  in Guadalajara, Jalisco

In the United States 
Stations in bold are clear-channel stations.

References

Lists of radio stations by frequency